The Diwan of Travancore was the head of government of Travancore, a princely state in South India. Appointed by the Maharaja of Travancore, the office of Diwan existed from 1729 to 1948, when it gave way to the office of Prime Minister of Travancore.

List of Diwans

 Arumukan Pillai 1729–1736
 Thanu Pillai 1736–1737
 Ramayyan Dalawa 1737–1756
 Martandan bagavathi Pillai 1756–1763
 Subbayyan Dalawa 1763–1768
 Krishna Gopalayyan Iyyer 1768–1776
 Vadiswaran Subbrahmanya Iyer 1776–1780
 Mullen Chempakaraman Pillai 1780–1782
 Nagercoil Ramayyan 1782–1788
 Krishnan Thampi 1788–1789
 Raja Kesavadas also known as Kesava Pillai 1789–1798
 Odiery Jayanthan Sankaran Nampoothiri 1798–1799
 Velu Thampi Dalawa 1799–1809
 Oommini Thampi 1809–1811
 Col. John Munro 1811–1814
 Devan Padmanabhan Menon 1814-1814
 Bappu Rao (Acting) 1814–1815
 Sanku Annavi Pillai 1815-1815
 Raman Menon 1815–1817
 Reddy Row 1817–1821
 T. Venkata Rao 1821–1830
 Thanjavur Subha Rao 1830–1837
 Ranga Rao (Acting) 1837–1838
 T. Venkata Rao (second time) 1838–1839
 Thanjavur Subha Rao (Again) 1839–1842
 Krishna Rao (Acting) 1842–1843
 Reddy Row (second time) 1843–1845
 Srinivasa Rao (Acting) 1845–1846
 Krishna Rao 1846–1857

See also
 Prime Minister of Hyderabad
 List of Diwans of Mysore

References
 Travancore, Princely States of India, WorldStatesmen.org

Specific

 
Lists of people from Kerala
India history-related lists
Diwans of Travancore